Vladimir Vasilevich Morozan (born 16 February 1957) is a Russian historian, genealogist, Doctor of Historical Sciences and Professor of the Faculty of History of St. Petersburg State University.

Biography
V.Morozan was born in Kishinev into the family of a police officer. The Morozanov family belonged to the small-scale owners of Bessarabia. After school, he came to enroll in the Faculty of Philosophy, but without success. A few years later, in 1984, he entered the History Department of the Leningrad State University, from which he graduated in (1990). He studied at the Department of Modern and Modern Times. The scientific supervisor was Nina Petrovna Evdokimova. At the university, he studied the history of Russian-German trade relations. Teachers: B.V. Ananych, E.R. Olkhovsky.

After graduating from the university, he worked for some time as a deputy head of the youth club association of the Nevsky district, then took a job as a teacher at the Department of National History at St. Petersburg State University. He was a candidate at the Department of Political History of Saint Petersburg State University(head-K. K. Khudoley), then-at the SPbU of the Russian Academy of Sciences (now-St. Petersburg. Institute of History).

In 1996 Morozan completed his PhD dissertation "State Savings banks in Pre-revolutionary Russia"  (Russian: Государственные сберегательные кассы в дореволюционной России) at the Saint Petersburg branch of the institute of Russian history at the Russian Academy of Science. In 2001 he completed his doctoral dissertation titled History of banking in Russia (second half of the 18th - first half of the 19th centuries) (Russian: История банковского дела в России (вторая половина XVIII — первая половина XIX вв.)), at the same university.

Having started teaching at the St. Petersburg State Medical University, where in 1991-1996 Morozan worked at the Department of National History, later in 1996-1997 he worked as an editor of the St. Petersburg Independent Humanitarian Academy. From 1997 to 2008-Senior lecturer, Associate Professor, Professor (since 2002) at the St. Petersburg State Agrarian University, in 2003-2008 he headed the Department of Russian History at the University.

From 2008 to 2014, he was a professor at the Department of the History of Entrepreneurship and Management at the Faculty of History of St. Petersburg State University. Since 2014, he has been a professor at the Department of History of the Peoples of the Commonwealth of Independent States of the Institute of History of St. Petersburg State University. His research interests include economic history of the XVIII-XX centuries, social history, local history, and genealogy. Most of his works are devoted to the history of finance and banking, the class system of the Russian Empire, as well as the history of Russian entrepreneurship. In particular, with his participation, such fundamental publications as "Credit and Banks in Russia before the beginning of the XX century: St. Petersburg and Moscow" (2005), " History of the Bank of Russia. 1860—2010» (2010). Morozan's research is based on various archival sources and is based on statistical data.

Awards

• Winner of the Academician I. D. Kovalchenko Prize of the Russian Academy of Sciences (2015) for the monograph "Business life in the South of Russia in the XIX-early XX century".

• In April 2019, he was awarded the Nicolae Milescu Spetaru Medal of the Academy of Sciences of Moldova.

• Winner of the Makariev Prize in the category "History of Orthodox Countries and Peoples" for the book "Bessarabia and its Nobility in the XIX-early XX centuries" (2019, second prize).

Works

Monographs
• Peterburg. Istoria bancov. SPb., 2001. 304 p.  (together with B.V.Ananjichem, S.G.Beljaevym, Z.V.Dmitrievoj, S.K.Lebedev, P.V.Lizunov)/Petersburg. A history of banks/.

• (The History of a banking in Russia (second half of the 18th - first half the 19th centuries)) 2001. 388 p. 

• Second edition St. Petersburg: Kriga, 2004. - 400 p. 

• Credit i banchi v Rossii do nachala XX veca: Sanct-Peterburg i Moscva. SPb., 2005. 667 p.  (together with B.V.Ananjichem, M.I.Arefjevoj, S.G.Beljaevym, A.V.Bugrovym, M.M.Dadykinoj, O.V.Dragan, Z.V.Dmitrievoj, S.K.Lebedev, P.V.Lizunov, J.A.Petrov, S.A.Salamatinoj). /The credit and banks in Russia prior to the beginning of 20th century: Saint Petersburg and Moscow/.

• Istoria sberegatelnih cass v imperatorscoi Rossii. SPb., 2007. 252 p.  /A history of savings banks in imperial Russia/.

Articles
• Iz istorii blagotvoritelnosti v Rossii // Russcoe proshloe. SPb., 1996. № 6. P. 5—15. /From a history of charity in Russia/;

• Perepisca I.I.Betskogo s Opecunschim sovetom S.-Peterburgscogo Vospitatelnogo doma // Russcoe proshloe. SPb.,1996. № 6. P. 16—21. /I.I.Betskogo's correspondence with Tutorial advice(council) of the St.-Petersburg Educational house/;

• Iz istorii sberegatelnogo dela v Rossii // Russcoe proshloe. SPb., 1996. № 7. P. 159—169. /From a history of a savings affair in Russia/;

• Iz istorii ruscoi economichescoi emigratzii con. XIX — nach. XX вв. // Novii Chasovoi. SPb., 1996. № 4. P. 23—34. /From a history of Russian economic emigration кон. 19th - нач. 20th centuries/;

• Sotzialnii sostav vcladchicov gosudarstvennih sberegatelnih cass v poreformennoi Possii i sfera prilojenia narodnih sberejenii // Dengi i credit. М., 1998. № 7. P. 73—79. /A social composition of investors of the state savings banks in пореформенной Russia and sphere of the appendix of national savings/;

• Economia e societa in Russia all inizio del secolo. // L altro novecento la Russia nella storia del ventesimo secoloю. Bergamo. 1999. With. 25-37;

• Economichescoe polojenie Russcoi Pravoslavnoi Tzercvi v contze XIX - nachale XX vv.// Nestor. SPb. - Chishinev. 2000. № 1. P. 311—300. /An economic situation of Russian Orthodox Church at the end of 19th - the beginning of 20th centuries/ ;

• Operatzionnaia deiatelnosti gosudarstvennih sberegatelnih cass i sotzialnii sostav vcladchicov v 1895—1916 gg. // Dengi i credit. М., 2001. № 9. P. 64—69. /Operational activity of the state savings banks and a social composition of investors in 1895-1916/;

• Uchrejdenie v Rossii sberegatelnih cass // Istoria glazami istoricov. SPb., 2002. P. 66—90. /Establishment in Russia of savings banks;

• Iz istorii arhivnogo dela v Rossii // Peterburgscaia istorichescaia shcola. Almanah. SPb., 2004. P. 370—385. /From a history of an archival affair in Russia/;

• Zaconodatelnoe regulirovanie torgovoi nesostoiatelnosti v Rossii v pervoi polovine XIX v. // Institut pravovedenia i predprinimatelstva - 10 let. Iubileinii sb. trudov. SPb., 2004. P. 13—19. /Legislative regulation of a trading inconsistency in Russia in first half 19th century/;

• Formirovanie i deiatelnosti administrativnih organov upravlenie v Bessarabscoi oblasti v nachale XIX v. Chasti 1 // SPb.: Clio. Jurnal dlia uchenih, 2005. № 1. (28). P. 125—134; Chasti 2. SPb.: Clio. Jurnal dlia uchenih, 2005. № 2. (29). P. 152—161. /Formation and activity of administrative controls in Bessarabia in the beginning of 19th century/;

• Rinoc jeleza b metaloizdelii i ego crupneishie operatori v Priazovscom crae v XIX v. // Industrialnoe nasledie. Materiali III nauchnoi conferentzii. Saransc, 2007. P. 456—467. /The market of iron and hardware and his(its) largest operators in edge(territory) Priazovskom in 19th century/;

• Marc Valjano i hlebnii rinoc v Priazovscom crae vo vtoroi polovine XIX v. // Chelovec v economiche: istoricheschii discurs. Materiali Vserossiiscoi nauchnoi conferentzii, posvechennoi 80-letiiu professora N. L. Klein. Samara, 2007. P. 55-64. /Mark Valjano and the grain market in edge(territory) Priazovskom in the second half of the 19th century/;
• Deiatelnosti Azovsco-Donscogo comerchescogo banca na Iuge Rossii v contze XIX v.

External links

Official
 Page on the website of the Institute of History of St. Petersburg State University
 Biografika St. Petersburg State University
 Page on ORCID iD

References

20th-century Russian historians
1957 births
Living people
Saint Petersburg State University alumni
21st-century Russian historians
People from Chișinău
Academic staff of Saint Petersburg State University